Ulf Marcus Daniel Ekenberg (born 16 June 1980) is a Swedish footballer who plays as a forward for Sölvesborgs GoIF.

Career statistics

References

External links
 
 

1980 births
Mjällby AIF players
Helsingborgs IF players
Allsvenskan players
Superettan players
Ettan Fotboll players
Division 2 (Swedish football) players
Swedish footballers
Living people
Association football forwards